Daniel L. Nagin (born c. 1970) is an American law professor. He is Clinical Professor of Law and the Vice Dean for Experiential and Clinical Education at the Harvard Law School.

Early life
Nagin was born circa 1969. He graduated from Cornell University, where he earned a bachelor's degree. He earned a master's degree from Stanford University, and  a JD from the University of Chicago Law School.

Career
Nagin was an acting co-director of the Homeless Legal Assistance Project at the Legal Services Organization of Indiana in Indianapolis, Indiana. He later became a professor at the University of Virginia School of Law. He is a law professor at the Harvard Law School.

Personal life
Nagin married Tomiko Brown-Nagin, an HLS professor, in 1998.

References

Living people
1970s births
Cornell University alumni
Stanford University alumni
University of Chicago Law School alumni
University of Virginia School of Law faculty
Harvard Law School faculty